122 Squadron or 122nd Squadron may refer to:

 122 Squadron (Israel)
 122 Squadron, Republic of Singapore Air Force, see list of Republic of Singapore Air Force squadrons
 112 Squadron, Ala 12, Spanish Air Force
 122 Squadron SAAF, South Africa
 No. 122 Squadron RAF, United Kingdom
 122d Fighter Squadron, United States Air Force
 122d Observation Squadron, United States Air Force
 VA-122 (U.S. Navy)
 VFA-122, United States Navy
 VMFA-122, United States Marine Corps
 122nd Fighter Aviation Squadron, Yugoslavia
 122nd Hydroplane Liaison Squadron, Yugoslavia